Financial scandal may refer to:
 Corporate scandal
 Accounting scandals, or corporate accounting scandals, political and business scandals
 Disclosure of expenses of Members of the United Kingdom Parliament